Coorlaghan Ringfort ( or ) is a ringfort (rath) and National Monument located in County Laois, Ireland.

Location
Coorlaghan Ringfort is located in the Barrow valley, southwest of Killeshin village.

History

The OS namebooks mention "there is a large Danish fort near the east boundary" of Coorlaghan townland. "Danish" is used here to refer to Viking settlement, although most ringforts were built and used by Gaelic Irish.

References

Archaeological sites in County Laois
National Monuments in County Laois